Du Ryer is a French family. Notable people of this name are:

 André du Ryer, a French orientalist
 Pierre du Ryer, a French playwright